Kevin C. Kelly is an American lawyer and politician from Connecticut. A Republican, he has been a member of the Connecticut State Senate since 2011, elected from the 21st District. He has been Senate Republican Minority Leader since 2021.

Education
Kelly earned a B.A. from Assumption College in 1982, an M.A. from Fairfield University in 1985, and a J.D. from University of Connecticut School of Law in 1997.

Legal and political career
Kelly was formerly a town attorney. He has a law office, Kevin Kelly & Associates, in Stratford, specializing in elder law. Before opening his legal practice, Kelly spent 13 years as an investigator for the Connecticut Department of Social Services.

In 1992, Kelly ran for the Connecticut House of Representatives in the 121st district. However, he lost the election to Terry Backer.

Since 2011, he has been a State Senator, representing part of the Naugatuck River Valley in the Connecticut Senate, including all of the town of Shelton and part of the towns of Monroe, Seymour, and Stratford.

In 2010, Kelly defeated James Miron, a former mayor of Stratford. In 2012, Kelly ran unopposed for the seat. In 2014, Kelly won reelection, defeating Democrat Prez Palmer. In 2016, Kelly won a fourth term in the Senate, again defeating Palmer. In 2018, Kelly won a fifth term in the Senate, defeating Democratic nominee Monica Tujak Brill. He ran unopposed in 2020.

In 2016, Kelly expressed support for Trump's presidential candidacy. In November 2020, the Senate Republican caucus elected Kelly to the post of Senate Minority Leader, replacing Len Fasano, who retired; Kelly appointed Paul Formica as his deputy. As of 2020, Kelly was the ranking member of the Senate committees on Aging, Insurance and Real Estate, and Children, and a member of the Regulation Review Committee.

In the state Senate, Kelly has championed efforts to make pregnancy a "qualifying life event" for purposes of health insurance enrollment; the legislation was supported by the Connecticut Commission on Women, Children and Seniors.

In 2020, Kelly voted against a police reform and accountability bill.

Personal life
Kelly is married and has four children and five grandchildren.

References

|-

21st-century American politicians
Assumption University (Worcester) alumni
Republican Party Connecticut state senators
Fairfield University alumni
Living people
University of Connecticut School of Law alumni
Year of birth missing (living people)